This article provides details of international football games played by the United Arab Emirates national football team from 2020 to present.

Results

2020

2021

2022

2023

Statistics

Managers

Head to head records

References 

Football in the United Arab Emirates
United Arab Emirates national football team results
2020s in Emirati sport